North Boarhunt is a village in the City of Winchester district of Hampshire, England. It is in the civil parish of Boarhunt.   Its nearest town is Fareham, which lies approximately 3.5 miles (5.2 km) south-west from the village.

Villages in Hampshire